The , or GRIPS, is an elite, highly selective research graduate school located in Minato, Tokyo. Funded by the Japanese Government, it has the status of national university. It is also one of Asia's leading think tanks of policy scholars and social scientists focused on policy studies. It offers programs in security and international affairs, diplomacy, international development studies, economics, political science, disaster studies, and science and technology policies, among others.

Overview
Founded in 1997 as a stand-alone graduate institute, GRIPS is composed of academics and practitioners with expertise in public sector policy formulation and management. Around 20% of the faculty and 70% of students are recruited from outside Japan. 

Locally known as GRIPS, the National Graduate Institute for Policy Studies is a stand-alone graduate school with an attached research center and a global reach. In August 2020, IDEAS ranked GRIPS to be the second highest-ranking Economics and Finance institute in Japan, only after the University of Tokyo. IDEAS also ranked GRIPS the 12th (from 14th in 2018) highest-ranking Economics and Finance research institution in Asia during the same time period based on research output and citations.

Academic programs 
Located in central Tokyo, the institute offers graduate programs at both the Master's and Ph.D. levels:

 Master’s Programs (International Programs)
 Young Leaders Program (School of Government)
 Young Leaders Program (School of Local Governance)
 One-year Master’s Program of Public Policy (MP1)
 Two-year Master’s Program of Public Policy (MP2)
 Macroeconomic Policy
 Public Finance
 Disaster Management Policy
 Economics, Planning and Public Policy
 Graduate Program in Japanese Language and Culture

 Master’s Programs (Domestic Programs)
 Public Policy
 Development Policy
 Cultural Policy
 Intellectual Property
 Urban Policy
 Education Policy
 Disaster Risk Management
 Science, Technology and Innovation Policy

 Ph.D. Program (5-Year Doctoral Program)
 Policy Analysis Program

 Ph.D./ Doctoral Programs (3-Year Doctoral Programs)
 Public Policy (Doctor of Public Policy)
 Security and International Studies (PhD/Doctor of International Relations)
 Disaster Management
 Science, Technology and Innovation Policy
 State Building and Economic Development
 Japanese Language and Culture

Notable academics
Fumio Hayashi: Professor of Economics

Hiroko Ōta: Professor of Economics. Former Japanese cabinet minister of economic policy.

Takatoshi Ito: Professor of Economics

Akihiko Tanaka: President. President of Japan International Cooperation Agency

Keijiro Otsuka: Emeritus Faculty 

Shinichi Kitaoka: Adjunct Professor. Former President of Japan International Cooperation Agency

References 

Educational institutions established in 1997
Japanese national universities
National Graduate Institute for Policy Studies
Public administration schools
1997 establishments in Japan